Success Academy may refer to:

 SUCCESS Academy, high schools in Utah
 SUCCESS Academy, in Iron County School District, Utah
 SUCCESS Academy at Southern Utah University, Cedar City, in the list of high schools in Utah#Iron County
 SUCCESS Academy at Dixie State College, St. George, in the list of high schools in Utah#Washington County
 Success Academy as an example of a school type, discussed n Small Learning Community#Types
 Success Academy or Communities in Schools- Success Academy in Laurel Highlands School District, Pennsylvania
 Success Academy, in Franklin-McKinley School District, California
 Success Academy (due to be phased out in 2013), in Glasgow High School (Delaware)
 Success Academy, part of Grand Forks Public Schools#Other services, North Dakota
 Success Academy, in Oxnard College, California
 Success Academy, in Patterson High School (Baltimore), Maryland
 Success Academy Charter Schools, elementary and middle schools in New York, N.Y.
 Freshman Warrior Success Academy, in East Gaston High School, North Carolina
 JBG International Success Academy, founded by James "Bird" Guess
 Kenton County School District, in Kenton County School District, Kentucky
 Knowledge and Success Academy, in the Baltimore City Public Schools, Maryland
 Math and Science Success Academy, in the list of primary and secondary schools in Tucson, AZ (Arizona)
 Pender Success Academy, in Pender County Schools#External links, North Carolina
 Polish Success Academy, referred to at the article Julita and Paula, a musical group
 Student Success Academy, in #Middle Schools &/or in #High Schools, both in Val Verde Unified School District, California
 Summer Success Academy, at Farmville Central High School, in the list of high schools in North Carolina (the Pitt County section).
 Texas Success Academy, Arlington, Tarrant County, in the list of high schools in Texas
 Thunder Success Academy, in Mountain View High School (Washington)#Thunder Success Academy, in State of Washington
 United for Success Academy, in the list of public Oakland California middle schools
 Yadkin Success Academy:
 List of high schools in North Carolina#Yadkin County
 Yadkin County, North Carolina#Public schools
 Youth Success Academy, in Georgia Northwestern Technical College

See also 
 Ninth Grade Success Academy (disambiguation)